Honami Tsuboi (born ) is a Japanese group rhythmic gymnast. She represents her nation at international competitions.

She participated at the 2008 Summer Olympics in Beijing. 
She also competed at world championships, including at the 2007 and 2009 World Rhythmic Gymnastics Championships.

References

External links

https://database.fig-gymnastics.com/public/gymnasts/biography/5786/true?backUrl=%2Fpublic%2Fresults%2Fdisplay%2F544%3FidAgeCategory%3D8%26idCategory%3D78%23anchor_41834

1989 births
Living people
Japanese rhythmic gymnasts
Sportspeople from Gifu Prefecture
Gymnasts at the 2008 Summer Olympics
Olympic gymnasts of Japan
21st-century Japanese women